The 2nd Mounted Rifles were a light cavalry regiment of the Royal Prussian Army. The regiment was formed 1 October 1905 in Langensalza where it belonged to the XI Army Corps.

See also
List of Imperial German cavalry regiments

References

Mounted Rifles of the Prussian Army
Military units and formations established in 1905
1905 establishments in Germany